Toramana also called Toramana Shahi Jauvla (Gupta script:  Toramāṇa, ruled circa 493-515 CE) was a king of the Alchon Huns who ruled in northern India in the late 5th and the early 6th century CE. Toramana consolidated the Hephthalite power in Punjab (present-day Pakistan and northwestern India), and conquered northern and central India including Eran in Madhya Pradesh. Toramana used the title "Great King of Kings" (Mahārājadhirāja ), equivalent to "Emperor", in his inscriptions, such as the Eran boar inscription.

The Sanjeli inscription of Toramana speaks of his conquest and control over Malwa and Gujarat. His territory also included Uttar Pradesh, Rajasthan and Kashmir. He probably went as far as Kausambi, where one of his seals was discovered.

According to the Rīsthal inscription, discovered in 1983, the Aulikara king Prakashadharma of Malwa defeated him.

Overview
Toramana is known from Rajatarangini, through coins and inscriptions.

Punjab inscription
An inscription found at Kura in the Salt Range records the building of a Buddhist monastery by a person named Rotta Siddhavriddhi during the reign of the Huna ruler Toramana. The donor expresses the wish that the religious merit gained by his gift be shared by him with the king and his family members. In the Khurā inscription (495-500, from the Salt Range in Punjab and now in Lahore), Toramana assumes the Indian regnal titles in addition to central Asian ones: Rājādhirāja Mahārāja Toramāṇa Shahi Jauvla. Among which Shahi is considered to be his Title and Jauvla being an epithet or Biruda. This is a Buddhist record in hybrid Sanskrit, recording the gift of a monastery (vihāra) to members of the Mahīśāsaka school.

Gwalior inscription of Mihirakula

In the Gwalior inscription of Mihirakula, from Gwalior in northern Madhya Pradesh, India, and written in Sanskrit, Toramana is described as:

Eran Boar inscription

The Eran Boar inscription (in Eran, Malwa, 540 km south of New Delhi, state of Madhya Pradesh) of his first regnal year indicates that eastern Malwa was included in his dominion. The Eran Boar inscription was erected in honor of the deity Vishnu as his avatar, Varaha.

The statue is of the deity in form of a boar, with engravings display it protecting rishis and upholding Dharma. Additionally, the statue contains Sanskrit inscriptions inscribed on the neck of the boar, in 8 lines of in Brahmi script. 
It also records the building of the temple in which the current Varaha image stands, by Dhanyavishnu, the younger brother of the deceased Maharaja Matrivishnu. The first line of the inscription, made after 484/85 CE mentions the "Maharajadhiraja Toramana" ("The great king of king Toramana") and reads:

Sack of Kausambi
The presence of seals in the name of "Toramana" and "Hunaraja" in Kausambi, suggests that the city was probably sacked by the Alkhons under Toramana in 497–500.

Defeats

According to the Rishtal stone-slab inscription, discovered in 1983, the Aulikara king Prakashadharma of Malwa defeated him in 515 CE.

Toramana may also have been defeated by the Indian Emperor Bhanugupta of the Gupta Empire in 510 A.D. according to the Eran inscription, although the "great battle" to which Bhanagupta participated is not explicited.

A few silver coins of Toramana closely followed the Gupta silver coins. The only difference in the obverse is that the king's head is turned to the left. The reverse retains the fantailed peacock and the legend is almost similar, except the change of name to Toramana Deva.

A Jaina work of the 8th century, the Kuvalayamala states that he lived in Pavvaiya on the bank of the Chandrabhaga and enjoyed the sovereignty of the world.

Successor
Toramana was succeeded by his son Mihirakula.

See also
 Hephthalite Empire
 Mihirakula
 Alchon Huns

Notes

5th-century Indian monarchs
6th-century Indian monarchs
History of Kashmir
Hephthalites